Shauna Barbosa (born ca. 1988) is the author of the poetry collection Cape Verdean Blues (University of Pittsburgh Press, 2018). She was a finalist for PEN America's 2019 Open Book Award and was a 2018 Disquiet International Luso-American fellow.

Early life 
Barbosa was born to an African-American mother and Cape Verdean father, and grew up in Roxbury, Boston, Massachusetts. Her parents met working at Polaroid. She has four siblings.

At age 15, she worked at the Funky Fresh music store in Boston, which fostered her love of music and mixtapes. In high school, she reviewed albums for her school paper. Later, she worked as an intern at Vibe Magazine.

Life and work 
Barbosa received her MFA from Bennington College in Vermont and currently resides in Los Angeles, California where she teaches Creative Writing in the Writers’ Program at UCLA Extension. Her poems have appeared or are forthcoming in The New Yorker, Ploughshares, AGNI, Iowa Review, Virginia Quarterly Review, Boulevard, Poetry Society of America, PBS Newshour, Lit Hub, Lenny Letter, and others.

She cites the writers Camonghne Felix, Lucille Clifton, Ariana Reines, Patricia Smith, Dean Young, Anne Sexton, Michael Ondaatje, Jorge Barbosa, and Corsino Fortes as inspiration, as well as the lyrics of Juvenile, Nas, Frank Ocean, Amy Winehouse and Andre 3000.

Cape Verdean Blues
Barbosa's poetry collection Cape Verdean Blues was published in 2018. In their review, Publishers Weekly said, "In her strong debut, Barbosa delves into how the nuances of identity are formed through intersecting struggles. She characterizes identity as mutable, flexible, and a means to keep the memories that shape a person. Writing of her Cape Verdean upbringing in Boston, Barbosa investigates what it means to be a woman of color and a cultural other."

Kendrick Lamar praised the book, saying, "These words feel like experiences. Some are personal, most are enlightening, but all connect. Connect on a higher level. A spiritual level."

Lit Hub named it one of their favorite books of 2018.

The book is named after the jazz musician Horace Silver's 1966 album The Cape Verdean Blues.

Five poems translated into French were published in Europe in April 2020 ("Broke", "Deniz", "Strology Virgo", "Something African with a K", "And I Know That She Feels Beautiful - Do We Have Cancer").

Bibliography

Poetry 
Collections
 
List of poems

References 

Living people
African-American poets
American people of Cape Verdean descent
Bennington College alumni
People from Roxbury, Boston
The New Yorker people
Writers from Boston
Year of birth missing (living people)
American women poets
Poets from Massachusetts
21st-century American poets
21st-century African-American women writers
21st-century African-American writers
21st-century American women writers
Cape Verdean writers